Conti is an Italian surname.

Geographical distribution
As of 2014, 63.5% of all known bearers of the surname Conti were residents of Italy (frequency 1:756), 11.8% of the United States (1:24,071), 9.2% of Brazil (1:17,439), 6.3% of Argentina (1:5,300), 2.5% of France (1:21,201) and 1.3% of the Philippines (1:58,961).

In Italy, the frequency of the surname was higher than national average (1:756) in the following regions:
 Tuscany (1:360)
 Umbria (1:363)
 Marche (1:370)
 Lazio (1:412)
 Emilia-Romagna (1:478)
 Lombardy (1:531)
 Sicily (1:624)
 Liguria (1:628)

In Argentina, the frequency of the surname was higher than national average (1:5,300) in the following provinces:
 Santa Fe Province (1:3,222)
 Córdoba Province (1:3,292)
 Buenos Aires (1:4,110)
 Mendoza Province (1:4,201)
 Buenos Aires Province (1:4,408)
 La Pampa Province (1:4,731)

People
 The historical Conti di Segni, family
 Andrea dei Conti (1240–1302), Italian Roman Catholic priest
 Giovanni dei Conti di Segni (died 1213), Italian cardinal
 Giovanni Conti (cardinal) (1414–1493), Italian cardinal
 Francesco Conti (cardinal) (died 1521), Italian cardinal
  Lotario dei Conti di Segni, Pope Innocent III (1160 or 1161 – 16 July 1216), Italian pope
 Michelangelo Conti, Pope Innocent XIII (1655–1724), Italian pope
 Ottaviano dei Conti di Segni (died 1234), Italian cardinal
 Torquato Conti (1591–1636), 17th-century Italian military officer
 Ugolino di Conti, Pope Gregory IX (/70 – 22 August 1241), Italian pope
 a surname derived from the toponym Conty, France (cf. Princes of Conti)
 Louis Armand II de Bourbon, prince de Conti, Prince of Conti from 1709 to 1727
 Al Conti (born 1968), Grammy-nominated New Age composer, arranger, producer, and multi-instrumentalist
 Albert Conti (1887–1967), Austrian-Hungarian-born Italian-American film actor
 Alberto Coletti Conti (1885–?), Italian sports shooter
 Alberto Conti (born 1966), astrophysicist
 Aldo Conti (1890–1988), Italian painter
 Alexander Conti (born 1993), Canadian actor
 Andrea Conti (footballer, born 1977), Italian football player
 Andrea Conti (footballer, born 1994), Italian football player
 Antonio Schinella Conti (1677–1749), Italian historian, mathematician, philosopher and physicist
 Arnaldo Conti (1885–1919), Italian conductor of opera
 Augusto Conti (born 1905), Italian philosopher and educationist
 Bernardino de' Conti (died 1525), Italian painter
 Bill Conti (born 1942), film music director
 Bob Conti (born 1947), American percussionist, record producer, songwriter, singer
 Bruno Conti (born 1955), former football player and member of the Italy national football team in 1982
 Carlo Conti (born 1961), Italian television presenter
 Carlos Conti (1916–1975), Spanish comic writer
  (born 1973), Italian actress
 Christian Conti (born 1987), Italian football player
 Daniele Conti (born 1979), Italian football player
 Diana Conti (born 1956), Argentine lawyer and politician
 Elena Conti (born 1967), Italian biochemist and molecular biologist
 Elmer W. Conti (1921–1988), American businessman and politician
 Enio Conti (1913–2005), former US NFL player
 Ettore Conti (1871–1972), Italian civil engineer, electricity industrialist, and businessman
 Evan Conti (born 1993), American-Israeli basketball player and coach 
 Fabio Conti, Italian water polo coach
 Febo Conti (1926–2012), Italian TV and radio presenter
 Flora Di Conti (1898–1952), an early direct disciple of Paramahansa Yogananda
 Francesca Conti (born 1972), female water polo goalkeeper
 Francesco Bartolomeo Conti (1681–1732), Florentine composer
 Francesco Conti (painter) (1681–1760), Italian artist
 Fulvio Conti (born 1947), Italian financier
 Gene Conti (born 1946), American government official
 Germán Conti (born 1994), Argentine footballer
 Gregorio Conti, birthname of antipope Victor IV
 Giacomo Conti (artist) (1813–1888), Italian painter
 Giacomo Conti (bobsledder) (1918–1992), Italian bobsledder
 Gianmarco Conti (born 1992), Italian professional footballer
 Gioacchino Conti (1714–1761), 18th-century castrato singer
 Gustavo de Conti (born 1980), Brazilian professional basketball coach
 Guy Conti (born 1942), baseball advisor and bullpen coach
 Haroldo Conti (1925–1976), Argentine writer, screenwriter, teacher, and Latin professor
 Italia Conti (1873–1946), English actress
 , drummer with the band Azymuth
 Jason Conti (born 1975), former outfielder in Major League Baseball
 Jesse Corti (born 1955), a Venezuelan-American actor and voice actor
 Jim Conti, a member of Streetlight Manifesto
 Joe Conti (born 1954), president of the Pennsylvania Association of Broadcasters
 John Conti, the founder of the john conti Coffee Company
 Joy Flowers Conti (born 1948), a Chief United States District Judge
 Kathleen Conti, member of the Colorado House of Representatives
 Laura Conti (1921–1993), Italian anti-fascist partisan and a figure for Italian environmentalism
 Leonardo Conti (1900–1945), German hockey player
 Leonardo Conti (1900–1945), Swiss physician
 Leopoldo Conti (1901–1970), Italian professional football player and coach
 Luigi Conti (nuncio) (1929–2015), Roman Catholic archbishop and diplomat
 Marco Conti (born 1969), Captain Regent of San Marino
 Mario Conti (1934–2022), Scottish Roman Catholic prelate
 Marzio Conti (born 1960), Italian conductor and flautist
 Matías Conti (born 1990), Argentine football striker
 Michele Conti (born 1983), Italian Grand Prix motorcycle racer
 Natale Conti, an Italian mythographer, poet, humanist and historian
 Neil Conti (born 1959), English drummer and music producer
 Niccolò Da Conti, 15th-century Venetian merchant and explorer
 Nina Conti (born 1973), ventriloquist and daughter of Tom Conti
 Pamela Conti (born 1982), Italian football attacking midfielder
 Paolo Conti (born 1950), former Italian football goalkeeper
 Petra Conti (born 1988), Italian ballerina
 Piero Gadda Conti (1902–1999), Italian novelist and film critic
 Piero Ginori Conti (1865–1939), businessman and Italian politician
 Rafael Conti (1746–1814), colonel in the Spanish Army
 Raúl Conti (1928–2008), Argentine professional football player
 Richard Conti (1937–2016), Judge of the Federal Court of Australia
 Robert Conti (born 1945), American guitarist
 Roberto Conti, Italian cyclist
 Roberto Conti (mathematician) (1923–2006), Italian mathematician
 Samuel Conti (1922-2018), United States federal judge
 Samuele Conti (born 1991), Italian professional racing cyclist
 Servílio Conti (1916–2014), an Italian Prelate of the Roman Catholic Church
 Stefano Conti, Italian 18th century merchant from Lucca
 Taynara Conti (born 1995), Brazilian professional wrestler and former judoka
 Tito Conti (1842–1924), Italian painter
 Tom Conti (born 1941), Scottish actor, theatre director, and novelist
 Ugo Conti (born 1955), Italian actor
 Valerio Conti (born 1993), Italian cyclist
 Walt Conti (born 1959), special effects artist

See also 
 "Conti", an abbreviation for the German automobile part manufacturer Continental AG
 Estadio Raúl Conti, a multi-purpose stadium in Puerto Madryn, Argentina
 Motta de' Conti, a comune (municipality) in the Province of Vercelli in the Italian region Piedmont
 Prince of Conti, a title of nobility; cadet house of Bourbon-Condé
 Serra de' Conti, a comune (municipality) in the Province of Ancona in the Italian region Marche
 Silviniaco Conti, a French-bred, British-trained Selle Francais racehorse
 Princess of Conti

Disambiguation pages 
 Andrea Conti (disambiguation)
 Cardinal Conti (disambiguation)
 Francesco Conti (disambiguation)
 Giacomo Conti (disambiguation)
 Giovanni Conti (disambiguation)
 Luigi Conti (disambiguation)

References

Italian-language surnames
Surnames of Italian origin